Sammy and Rosie Get Laid is a 1987 British film directed by Stephen Frears, with a screenplay by Hanif Kureishi.

Plot
Sammy and Rosie are a married couple, both leading a promiscuous bohemian lifestyle until Sammy's father comes to visit to escape past issues.

Cast
 Shashi Kapoor as Rafi
 Frances Barber as Rosie
 Claire Bloom as Alice
 Ayub Khan-Din as Sammy
 Roland Gift as Danny
 Meera Syal as Ranii
 Lesley Manville as Margy

References

External links

Films directed by Stephen Frears
Films with screenplays by Hanif Kureishi
1987 films
1987 comedy films
British comedy films
British Indian films
1980s English-language films
Films scored by Stanley Myers
Film4 Productions films
Working Title Films films
1980s British films